Paris Community Unit School District No. 4 (Paris CUSD 4) is a school district headquartered in Paris, Illinois. It operates a single school, Crestwood School.

It serves small portions of the Paris city limits and most of the surrounding unincorporated areas, as well as Vermilion.

References

External links
 
School districts in Illinois
Education in Edgar County, Illinois